Ngwe Tar Yi (16 February 1925 - 19 March 1959) was a Burmese woman poet and writer.

Early life and education 

She was born in Rangoon (Yangon) on February 16, 1925 and given the birth name Daw Khin Yi. Her father was Biritsh U Nyunt and her mother was Daw Chit Tin. She was the third of five siblings.

As a teenager she studied at Myoma high school for girls in Rangoon. At twelve years of age, she learned the poems of Zawgyi (writer) and Min Thu Wun. At fourteen years of age in 1939, she dropped out of school for medical reasons. After dropping out, she studied the ancient Burmese literature with Maung Thuta (Major Ba Thaung) and English literature with Mrs. Mannroo.

Careers 
She began to write poetry when she was 15 years old. At 18 years of age in 1943, she began writing in the Tatthit Handbook, which was published by young people in the area of Tamwe. Then she published poetry and entered the literary world. Her mother died that same year.

In the journals Dudo and Yu Waddy, she wrote vice-versa poems with one of her friends, MP Khin Pu (Pen name was Ngwe Wutt Yi), the daughter of Dudo U Ba Cho. Ngwe Wutt Yi died earlier than Ngwe Tar Yi. After her death, she wrote poem for her friend.

In 1944, she published Minn Sayy Yay Pell Mhuan Thalarr and  kabyaarshe Short Novel (မင်ဆေးရည်ပဲ မှုန်သလားနှင့် ကဗျာရှင်ဝတ္ထုတို) and in 1947, she published the Malala Myaing Poems Book. In 1948, she visited India. Ngwe, in partnership with her husband published a book of Yadanar poems in 1954.
In the same year, she received the Literary Translation Award (now called the National Literature Award) for her book Kabarkyaw aehswat Stories (ကမ္ဘာကျော် အီစွတ်ပုံပြင်များ စာအုပ်) in conjunction with her husband Min Yu Wai.

She wrote four poetry books. The 100 Poems of Ngwe Tar Yi was published in 1960. She also won the Poetry Prize (now also called the National Literature Award).

Her poems are still used today in middle and high school textbooks.

Personal life
In 1952, she married Min Yu Wai , a writer (b) the education minister of Insein District, U Win Maung.

References

1925 births
1959 deaths
Burmese writers
Burmese women poets
People from Yangon Region